The Men's Slalom LW1 was one of the events held in Alpine skiing at the 1988 Winter Paralympics in Innsbruck.

There were five competitors in the final. Three out of five competitors were disqualified and as a result only two medals were awarded.

Results

Final

References 

Slalom